Mughal tombs are a set of tombs built by various ruling in Mughal Emperors. All of them have marked influence from Iranian Timurid forms. The Mughal dynasty was established after the victory of Babur at Panipat in 1526. During his five-year reign, Babur took considerable interest in erecting buildings, though few have survived. His grandson Akbar built widely, and the style developed vigorously during his reign. Among his accomplishments were Agra Fort, the fort-city of Fatehpur Sikri, and the Buland Darwaza. Akbar's son Jahangir commissioned the Shalimar Gardens in Kashmir. Mughal architecture reached its zenith during the reign of Shah Jahan, who constructed Taj Mahal, the Jama Masjid, the Shalimar Gardens of Lahore, the Wazir Khan Mosque, and who renovated the Lahore Fort. The last of the great Mughal architects was Aurangzeb, who built the Badshahi Mosque, Bibi Ka Maqbara, Moti Masjid etc.

Mughal architecture, a type of Indo-Islamic architecture developed during the 16th, 17th and 18th centuries throughout the ever-changing extent of their empire in the Indian subcontinent. It developed the styles of earlier Muslim dynasties in India as an amalgam of Islamic, Persian and Indian architecture. Mughal buildings have a uniform pattern of structure and character, including large bulbous domes, slender minarets at the corners, massive halls, large vaulted gateways, and delicate ornamentation; Examples of the style can be found in modern-day Afghanistan, Bangladesh, India and Pakistan.

Precedents
Iltutmish was the first emperor to have a large tomb in the subcontinent. Most of the tombs in the Mughal Empire had marked influence from Iranian Timurid forms. During the period of Lodis, there were hundreds of tombs built all across the empire. The tombs of nobles were bigger and more elaborate than that of the royals. While the royal tombs were octagonal, one of the nobles was square in shape. The square-shaped tombs were followed even during the Mughal tombs until the 18th century. Sher Shah Suri at one time had the largest tomb in India built for himself at Sasaram. The nine bays in the Mughal tombs in replicated from Timurid women house architecture. Babur in his memoir records the numerous memories in Timurid Herat, which inspired him to create the Mughal gardens.

 - Mughal Emperors.

Notes

References
 

Mughal tombs